The 2017–18 UAE Pro League was the 43rd season of top-level football in the United Arab Emirates. Al-Jazira are the defending champions after winning their second title last season. Ajman and Dubai both got promoted on 22 April 2017 after beating Fujairah 3–2 and Ras Al Khaimah  2–0. On 3 May 2017, Baniyas were the first team to get relegated after drawing 4–4 against Emirates. Kalba were the last team to get relegated after losing to Al-Ain 2–1 and both Emirates and Dibba Al-Fujairah didn't lose in the same week. In July 2017 Al Ahli, Al Shabab and Dubai merged to make Shabab Al Ahli-Dubai. In 20 April 2018 Hatta lost to Al Wasl 2–0 and were the first team to get relegated. On 21 April Al Ain were crowned the champions of the league for the 13th time after destroying Al Nasr 4–0. On the final day Emirates were relegated after drawing against Al Nasr 2–2 and Al Nasr. In May 2018 it turns out that since the League needs 14 teams for next year it is decided that the bottom two teams of this year will have to face 3rd and 4th placed team of the 2nd division to see who will secure a spot next year.

Stadia and locations

Note: Table lists clubs in alphabetical order.

Number of teams by Emirates

Personnel and kits 

Note: Flags indicate national team as has been defined under FIFA eligibility rules. Players may hold more than one non-FIFA nationality.

Managerial changes

Foreign players
Restricting the number of foreign players strictly to four per team, including a slot for a player from AFC countries. A team could use four foreign players on the field during each game including at least one player from the AFC country.

Players name in bold indicates the player is registered during the mid-season transfer window.

League table
<onlyinclude>

Results

UAE Relegation Play Offs
Because the League 2018–2019 season needs 14 teams, the bottom two teams of year and the 3rd and 4th place team of the 2nd division will have to face  each other to see who will secure the final two spots this year.

First leg

Second Leg

Fujairah won 3–1 on aggregate.

Emirates won 1–0 on aggregate.

References

UAE Pro League seasons
1
UAE